The Battle of Renty was fought on 12 August 1554, between France and the Holy Roman Empire at Renty, a northern French secondary theatre of the Italian Wars. The French were led by Francis, Duke of Guise, while the Imperial forces were led by Emperor Charles V of Habsburg.

Aftermath
Duke Francis had already forced the emperor to abandon the Siege of Metz in 1552. King Henry II of France had occupied the city according to the terms of the Treaty of Chambord he had signed with several Protestant Imperial princes. The French repelled Charles' 1554 invasion, the emperor abdicated two years later and King Henry II ultimately retained the Three Bishoprics of Metz, Toul, and Verdun.

References

References

 

Battles involving the Holy Roman Empire
Battles involving France
1554 in France
Conflicts in 1554
Military history of the Pas-de-Calais
Italian War of 1551–1559
Charles V, Holy Roman Emperor